This record is one of a string of mid-career recordings by Chicago natives Enuff Z'Nuff. Paraphernalia is arguably heavier in nature than many of their previous recordings. This album is also notable for its guest appearances from other famous Chicago area musicians, including Rick Nielsen of Cheap Trick, James Young of Styx, and Billy Corgan of The Smashing Pumpkins, all featured on lead guitar for several of the album's tracks.

A promotional video was shot for the single "Freak". The director of the video, comedian Matt Kissane, is also a Chicago resident. Clips from the "Freak" video were televised nationally on VH1. The song "Ain't It Funny" also received national exposure with the band's live performance on The Jenny Jones Show.

The cover art of the US version of the album is a homage to the rock band Queen's second album, Queen II. The Japanese version of Paraphernalia, released earlier than the US edition, features different artwork and fewer songs than its domestic counterpart. While promoting this record, the full band toured in Japan for the first time, where they have found some success over the years.

Track listing
All songs written by Donnie Vie and Chip Z'Nuff, except where indicated
 "Freak" – 4:54
 "Top of the Hill" – 2:53
 "Ain't It Funny" – 3:44
 "Believe in Love" – 4:36
 "Habit" – 4:01
 "Baby You're the Greatest" – 4:42
 "Someday" (Vie) – 3:43
 "Unemotional" – 3:57
 "Invisible" – 4:19
 "All Alone" – 4:10
 "Everything Works if You Let It" (Rick Nielsen) – 3:17
 "Save Me" – 3:30 (US Release Only)
 "No Place to Go"  – 4:00 (US Release Only)
 "Loser of the World" (Vie) – 2:29

Personnel
Enuff Z'Nuff
Donnie Vie – lead vocals, guitars, keyboards, producer
Chip Z'Nuff – bass guitar, guitars and vocals, producer
Johnny Monaco – lead guitar
Ricky Parent – drums

Additional musicians
Rick Nielsen – lead guitar (tracks 1, 8 & 10)
"J.Y." Young – lead guitar (tracks 2, 9 & 12)
Billy Corgan – lead guitar (track 11)

Production
Chris Shepard – engineer, mixing
Eric Gast, Jeff Luif, Johnny K, Mike Tholen, Phil Bonanno, "Dollar" Douglas, Jeff Lane, Duane Exline, Ron Lowe – engineers
Dan Stout – mastering

Release history

References 

Enuff Z'nuff albums
1999 albums
Spitfire Records albums